Usovo is a village in Bondarsky District of Tambov Oblast, Russia.

References

Rural localities in Tambov Oblast